Ilya Valeryevich Lantratov (born 11 November 1995) is a Russian football player. He plays for Lokomotiv Moscow.

Club career
He made his professional debut in the Russian Professional Football League for FC Lokomotiv-2 Moscow on April 22, 2014 in a game against FC Dolgoprudny.

He made his Russian Football National League debut for FC Baltika Kaliningrad on 25 November 2017 in a game against FC Yenisey Krasnoyarsk. He was on trial in Russian Premier League club PFC Sochi in 2020.

He made his Russian Premier League debut for FC Khimki on 8 August 2020 in a game against PFC CSKA Moscow.

On 30 December 2022, Lantratov returned to Lokomotiv Moscow on a 3.5-year contract.

International career
He was called up to the Russia national football team for the first time in October 2021 for the World Cup qualifiers against Cyprus and Croatia. He was included in the extended 41-players list of candidates.

Career statistics

References

External links
 
 
 

1995 births
People from Prokhorovsky District
Sportspeople from Belgorod Oblast
Living people
Russian footballers
Russia under-21 international footballers
Association football goalkeepers
FC Salyut Belgorod players
FC Lokomotiv Moscow players
FC Shinnik Yaroslavl players
FC Baltika Kaliningrad players
FC Fakel Voronezh players
FC Khimki players
Russian Premier League players
Russian First League players
Russian Second League players